Jeffrey Thomas Porcaro (April 1, 1954 – August 5, 1992) was an American drummer, songwriter, and record producer. He is best known for his work with the rock band Toto but is one of the most recorded session musicians in history, working on hundreds of albums and thousands of sessions. While already an established studio player in the 1970s, he came to prominence in the United States as the drummer on the Steely Dan album Katy Lied.

AllMusic has characterized him as "arguably the most highly regarded studio drummer in rock from the mid-'70s to the early '90s" and says that "it is no exaggeration to say that the sound of mainstream pop/rock drumming in the 1980s was, to a large extent, the sound of Jeff Porcaro." He was posthumously inducted into the Modern Drummer Hall of Fame in 1993.

Early life
Jeffrey Thomas Porcaro was born on April 1, 1954, in Hartford, Connecticut, the eldest son of Los Angeles session percussionist Joe Porcaro (1930–2020) and his wife, Eileen. His younger brother Mike was a successful bassist and was a member of the band Toto. Younger brother Steve is still a studio musician and also was a member of Toto. Porcaro was raised in the San Fernando Valley area of Los Angeles and attended Ulysses S. Grant High School. Jeff's youngest sibling was sister Joleen, born in 1960.

On October 22, 1983, Porcaro married Susan Norris, a Los Angeles television broadcaster at KABC-TV. Together, they had three sons, Christopher Joseph (1984), Miles Edwin Crawford (1986 - 2017) and Nico Hendrix (1991).

Career
Porcaro began playing drums at the age of seven. Lessons came from his father Joe Porcaro, followed by further studies with Bob Zimmitti and Richie Lepore. When he was seventeen, he got his first professional gig playing in Sonny & Cher's touring band. He later called Jim Keltner and Jim Gordon his idols at that time. During his twenties, Porcaro played on hundreds of albums, including several for Steely Dan. He toured with Boz Scaggs before co-founding Toto with his brother Steve and childhood friends Steve Lukather and David Paich. Jeff Porcaro is renowned among drummers for the drum pattern he used on the Grammy Award-winning Toto song "Rosanna", from the album Toto IV. The drum pattern, called the Half-Time Shuffle Groove, was originally created by drummer Bernard Purdie, who called it the "Purdie Shuffle." Porcaro created his own version of this groove by blending the aforementioned shuffle with John Bonham's groove heard in the Led Zeppelin song "Fool in the Rain" while keeping a Bo Diddley beat on the kick drum. Porcaro describes this groove in detail on a Star Licks video (now DVD) he created shortly after "Rosanna" became popular.

Besides his work with Toto, he was also a highly sought session musician. Porcaro collaborated with many of the biggest names in music, including George Benson, Tommy Bolin, Larry Carlton, Eric Carmen, Eric Clapton, Joe Cocker, Christopher Cross, Andrew Gold, Miles Davis, Dire Straits, Donald Fagen, Stan Getz, David Gilmour, James Newton Howard, Al Jarreau, Elton John, Leo Sayer, Greg Lake, Rickie Lee Jones, Paul McCartney, Michael McDonald, Bee Gees, Sérgio Mendes, Jim Messina, Pink Floyd, Lee Ritenour, Diana Ross, Boz Scaggs, Hoyt Axton, Seals and Crofts, Bruce Springsteen, Steely Dan, Barbra Streisand, Richard Marx, Warren Zevon,Don Henley, David Foster, Donna Summer, Frankie Valli and Joe Walsh. Porcaro contributed drums to four tracks on Michael Jackson's Thriller and also played on the Dangerous album hit "Heal the World". He also played on 10cc's ...Meanwhile (1992). Porcaro featured on Al Stewart's 1980 album 24 Carrots.  On the 1993 10cc Alive album, recorded after his death, the band dedicated "The Stars Didn't Show" to him.

Richard Marx dedicated the song "One Man" to him and said Porcaro was the best drummer he had ever worked with. Michael Jackson made a dedication to Porcaro in the liner notes for his 1995 album HIStory: Past, Present and Future, Book I.

Death
Porcaro died at Humana Hospital-West Hills on the evening of August 5, 1992, at the age of 38 after falling ill while spraying insecticide in the yard of his Hidden Hills home. The coroner ruled out an accident and determined a heart attack due to occlusive coronary artery disease caused by atherosclerosis resulting from cocaine use. However, a Los Angeles County Coroner spokesman (and some doctors who treated Porcaro) attributed his death to a heart attack caused by an allergic reaction to inhaled pesticide. Bandmate Steve Lukather and Porcaro’s wife stated they believed that Porcaro had also been suffering from a long-standing heart condition, and a smoking habit, both of which contributed to his death. Lukather noted that several of Porcaro’s family members had died at a young age due to heart disease.

His funeral was held on August 10 in the Forest Lawn – Hollywood Hills Cemetery, where he was buried on the Lincoln Terrace, lot 120. The Jeff Porcaro Memorial Fund was established to benefit the music and art departments of Grant High School in Los Angeles, California, where he was a student in the early 1970s. A memorial concert took place at the Universal Amphitheater in Los Angeles on December 14, 1992, with an all-star line-up that included George Harrison, Boz Scaggs, Donald Fagen, Don Henley, Michael McDonald, David Crosby, Eddie Van Halen and the members of Toto. The proceeds of the concert were used to establish an education trust fund for Porcaro's sons.

Porcaro's tombstone was inscribed with the following epitaph, comprising lyrics from the Kingdom of Desire track "Wings of Time": "Our love doesn't end here; it lives forever on the Wings of Time."

Discography

With Toto
 Toto (1978)
 Hydra (1979)
 Turn Back (1981)
 Toto IV (1982)
 Isolation (1984)
 Dune [original soundtrack] (1984)
 Olympic Games 1984 (soundtrack) [original soundtrack] (1984)
 Fahrenheit (1986)
 The Seventh One (1988)
 Past to Present 1977 - 1990 (1990)
 Kingdom of Desire (1992, released posthumously and dedicated to Jeff's memory)
 Toto XX (1998)
 Greatest Hits Live...and More (DVD with behind the scenes footage and interviews)
 Old Is New (2018, posthumous appearance)

With other artists
 Jack Daugherty – The Class of Nineteen Hundred and Seventy One (1971)
 Seals & Crofts – Diamond Girl (1973); Unborn Child (1974); Get Closer (1976)
 Joe Cocker – I Can Stand a Little Rain (1974); Civilized Man (1984)
 Steely Dan – Pretzel Logic (1974) - "Night by Night", "Parker's Band"; Katy Lied (1975); "FM (No Static at All)" (1978, for the FM movie soundtrack album); Gaucho (1980) - "Gaucho"
 Andrew Gold (1978) - Thank You For Being a Friend
 Tommy Bolin – Teaser (1975) - "The Grind", "Homeward Strut", "Dreamer", "Teaser"
 Les Dudek – Les Dudek (1976)
 Three Dog Night - American Pastime (1976)
 Jackson Browne – The Pretender (1976)
 Leo Sayer – Endless Flight (1976) - "When I Need You"; Thunder in My Heart (1977); Leo Sayer (1978); World Radio (1982); Have You Ever Been in Love (1983)
 Boz Scaggs – Silk Degrees (1976); Down Two Then Left (1977); Middle Man (1980); "Look What You've Done to Me" (1980, featured in the movie Urban Cowboy); "Miss Sun" (1980, released as a single, then included on the compilation Hits!); Other Roads (1988)
 John Sebastian – Welcome Back (1976)
 Carly Simon – "Nobody Does It Better" (1977)
 Eric Carmen – Boats Against the Current (1977) - "She Did It", "Boats Against the Current", "Love Is All That Matters"
 Valerie Carter – Just a Stone's Throw Away (1977); Wild Child (1978)
 Lisa Dal Bello – Lisa Dal Bello (1977)
 Alan O'Day - Undercover Angel (1977)
 Hall & Oates – Beauty on a Back Street (1977)
 Lee Ritenour – Captain Fingers (1977); Rit (1981)
 Diana Ross – Baby It's Me (1977); Ross (1983)
 Colin Blunstone – Never Even Thought (1978)
 Larry Carlton – Larry Carlton (1978); Sleepwalk (1981); Friends (1983)
 Allen Toussaint – Motion (1978)
 Dave Mason – Mariposa De Oro (1978) - "Will You Still Love Me Tomorrow"
 Warren Zevon – Excitable Boy (1978) - "Nighttime in the Switching Yard"; Mr. Bad Example (1991)
 Ruben Blades – Nothing but the Truth (1988)
 Bim – Thistles (1978)
 Jerry Williams – Gone (1978)
 Al Stewart – Time Passages (1978) - "Valentina Way"
 Marc Jordan - Mannequin (1978)
 The Pointer Sisters - Energy (1978)
 Linda Evans - "You Control Me" (1979)
 Rickie Lee Jones – Rickie Lee Jones (1979); The Magazine (1984)
 Janne Schaffer – Earmeal (1979)
 Lowell George – Thanks, I'll Eat It Here (1979)
 Flyer – Send a Little Love My Way (1979)
Bill Hughes – Dream Master (1979)
 Pink Floyd – The Wall (1979) - "Mother"
 Aretha Franklin – Aretha (1980); Love All the Hurt Away (1981)
 Mariya Takeuchi – Miss M (1980)
 The Brothers Johnson – Winners (1981)
 Peter Frampton – Breaking All the Rules (1981)
 Bee Gees – Living Eyes (1981)
 Char  – U.S.J (1981)
 Christopher Cross – "Arthur's Theme (Best That You Can Do)" (1981); Another Page (1983); Rendezvous (1992)
 Randy Crawford – Secret Combination (1981); Windsong (1982); Nightline (1983)
 Al Jarreau – Breakin' Away (1981) - "Breakin' Away"; Girls Know How (1982, soundtrack for movie Night Shift); Jarreau (1983) - "Mornin'", "Step by Step", "Black and Blues"
 Amii Ozaki – Hot Baby (1981)
 Greg Lake – Greg Lake (1981)
 Crosby, Stills & Nash – Daylight Again (1982); Allies (1983)
 Eye to Eye – Eye to Eye (1982)
 Michael Jackson – Thriller (1982) - "The Girl is Mine", "Beat It", "Human Nature", "The Lady in My Life"; Dangerous (1991) - "Heal the World"
 Donna Summer – Donna Summer (1982) - "Protection"
 Elton John – Jump Up! (1982)
 Melissa Manchester – Hey Ricky (1982) - "You Should Hear How She Talks About You"
 Donald Fagen – The Nightfly (1982)
 Herbie Hancock – Lite Me Up (1982)
 Don Henley – I Can't Stand Still (1982) - "Dirty Laundry"; The End of the Innocence (1989) - "New York Minute" 
 Michael McDonald – If That's What It Takes (1982) - "I Keep Forgettin'"; No Lookin' Back (1985); Take It to Heart (1990)
 The Imperials – Stand By The Power (1982)
 George Benson – In Your Eyes (1983) - "Lady Love Me (One More Time)"
 James Newton Howard – James Newton Howard and Friends (1983)
 Lionel Richie – Can't Slow Down (1983) - "Running with the Night"; Louder Than Words (1996) - "The Climbing"
 Paul Simon – Hearts and Bones (1983) - "Train in the Distance"
 Randy Newman – Trouble in Paradise (1983) - "I Love L.A."
 Russ Taff – Walls of Glass (1983) - "Walls of Glass", "Jeremiah", "Inside Look"; Russ Taft (1987) - "I Still Believe"
 Chicago – Chicago 17 (1984) - "Stay the Night"
 David Gilmour – About Face (1984)
 The Jacksons – Victory (1984) - "Torture", "Wait"; 2300 Jackson Street (1989) - ''Midnight Rendezvous
 Paul McCartney – Give My Regards to Broad Street (1984) - "Silly Love Songs"
 Joe Walsh – The Confessor (1985)
 Eric Clapton – Behind the Sun (1985) - "See What Love Can Do", "Forever Man"
 Peter Cetera – Solitude/Solitaire (1986)
 Earth, Wind & Fire – Touch the World (1987) - ''You and I'', ''Every Now and Then''
 Roger Hodgson – Hai Hai (1987)
 David Benoit – Freedom at Midnight (1987); Shadows (1991)
 Jon Anderson – In the City of Angels (1988)
 Luis Miguel – Busca Una Mujer (1988)
 Love and Money – Strange Kind of Love (1988)
 Patti Austin – The Real Me (1988); Love Is Gonna Getcha (1990)
 Dr. John – In a Sentimental Mood (1989)
 Nik Kershaw – The Works (1989) - "Walkabout"
 Poco – Legacy (1989)
 Clair Marlo – Let It Go (1989)
 Celine Dion – Have a Heart (1989)
 Natalie Cole – Good to Be Back (1989) - ''The Rest Of The Night'', "Miss You Like Crazy", ''Gonna Make You Mine'', "Starting Over Again"
 Benny Hester - Perfect (1989) 
 Madonna – Like a Prayer (1989) - "Cherish"; I'm Breathless (1990) - "Hanky Panky"
 Jude Cole – A View from 3rd Street (1990) - "Time for Letting Go", "Compared to Nothing"; Start the Car (1992) - "Open Road", "Tell The Truth"
 Sandi Patty – "Another Time...Another Place" (1990)
 Bruce Springsteen – "Viva Las Vegas" (1990, included in the collective album The Last Temptation of Elvis and featured in the movie Honeymoon in Vegas); Human Touch (1992)
 Fahed Mitre – Toda la Verdad (1990)
 Twenty Mondays – The Twist Inside (1990)
 Bryan Duncan – Anonymous Confessions of a Lunatic Friend (1990)
 Emily Remler – This Is Me (1990)
 Cher – Mermaids (1990) - "The Shoop Shoop Song (It's in His Kiss)"; Love Hurts (1991) - "Could've Been You"
 Michael Bolton – Time, Love & Tenderness (1991) - "When a Man Loves a Woman"
 Dire Straits – On Every Street (1991) - (Except "Heavy Fuel" & "Planet of New Orleans")
 Richard Marx – Rush Street (1991); Paid Vacation (1993) - "One Man"
 Bonnie Raitt – Luck of the Draw (1991)
 Rod Stewart – Vagabond Heart (1991) - "The Motown Song"
 Curtis Stigers – Curtis Stigers (1991)
 Ricky Gianco – E' rock & roll (1991)
 B-52s – Good Stuff (1992)
 Go West – Indian Summer (1992)
 10cc – ...Meanwhile (1992); Woman In Love (1992); Welcome To Paradise (1992)
 Sergio Mendes – Brasileiro (1992)
 Bruce Springsteen – Human Touch (1992) - "Human Touch"
 Paul Young – The Crossing (1993)
 David Crosby – Thousand Roads (1993)
 Patti Scialfa – Rumble Doll (1993) - "Come Tomorrow", "Talk to Me Like the Rain"
 Steve Porcaro – Someday/Somehow (2016) - "Back to You"

See also
 Rosanna shuffle

Book
The book It's About Time: Jeff Porcaro - The Man And His Music, a new biography written by Robyn Flans, was released on September 1, 2020. Foreword by Jim Keltner.

References

External links

 Tribute site with complete discography of sessions.
 Official Toto website section dedicated to Porcaro
 Porcaro page at Drummerworld
 2013 Audio Interview with Steve Lukather talking about Jeff Porcaro from the I'd Hit That podcast 
 Jeffporcaro.net
 
 

1954 births
1992 deaths
Musicians from Hartford, Connecticut
People from South Windsor, Connecticut
Grammy Award winners
American rock drummers
American session musicians
American people of Italian descent
Toto (band) members
Clover (band) members
Burials at Forest Lawn Memorial Park (Hollywood Hills)
20th-century American drummers
20th-century American male musicians
American male drummers
Deaths from atherosclerosis
Grant High School (Los Angeles) alumni